Adolphus Aghughu Arhotomhenla (born 7 September 1962 in Edo State, Nigeria) is a Nigerian public servant. He was the Auditor General for the Federation

 and Chairperson, African Union Board of External Auditors.

Early life and education
Adolphus is a graduate of Economics from Bendel State University now Ambrose Alli University, Ekpoma, Bendel State (Now Edo State) Nigeria in 1986. He performed his National Youth Service National Youth Service Corps (NYSC) in Kano State in 1987. He obtained a Master in (Economics) Money and Banking from the University of Benin (Nigeria), Benin City Nigeria in 1997.
He is currently a part-time PhD student (Environmental Resource Management) with effect from 2017 at the School of Postgraduate Studies, Nasarawa State University Keffi, Nigeria.

Professional career
He began his working career in 1980 as a teacher with Bendel State Government (now Edo State Government) and then became an Accountant with Edo State Government in 1988. 
He became an Auditor with the Office of the Auditor-General for the Federation in 1992. He was promoted to the rank of Director of Audit with effect from January 1, 2016, by the Federal Civil Service Commission (Nigeria) and was a candidate up to the final stage for the Post of Federal Permanent Secretary examination 2018 and 2019.

Adolphus is a Fellow of the Certified National Accountant of Nigeria, a fellow of the Chartered Institute of Taxation of Nigeria (FCTI) and a member of the Nigerian Institute of Management (Chartered).
Mr. Adolphus Aghughu retired from the civil service on Wednesday, September 7th, 2022, at the age of 60.

Personal life 
Adolphus is happily married and blessed with children and his hobbies include: Gardening, Driving and Reading.

References 

Auditors
1962 births
Nigerian civil servants
Ambrose Alli University alumni
University of Benin (Nigeria) alumni
People from Edo State
Living people